Ritah Namayanja Kivumbi (born May 1, 1980) also known as Ritah Wise, is a blind visual artist and motivational speaker. She is the founder and art director of Magezi Arts Exhibition Centre currently located at the Namirembe Guest House in Kampala. In 2016, Namayanja was awarded the presidential golden medal by President Museveni recognizing her efforts in empowering youths and women.

Background and education 
Namayanja attended Uganda Martyrs Senior School Namugongo (O-level) and Uganda Martyrs High School, Rubaga (A-level).

She joined Makerere University where she graduated with a Bachelor’s degree in Development Studies and later on attained a Master’s degree in Ethics and Public Management.

In November 2008, Namayanja developed frequent severe headaches and she became blind a month later, which led to her  falling into depression and self-pity for seven years.

Career 
Before Namayanja went blind, she was the administrator of the Makerere University Art Gallery and she organized the Magezi Art Exhibition in September 2008.

In 2008, shortly before Namayinja went blind, she founded the Magezi Arts Gallery, but it collapsed shortly thereafter because she fell into depression and self pity when she went blind. 

In March 2015, she revived the Magezi arts gallery, which deals in various visual artworks and also trains students from various tertiary institutions.

In 2016, on International Women's Day, Namayanja was awarded the Presidential Golden Medal by President Museveni recognizing her efforts in empowering youths and women.

References

External links 
 Website of Magezi Arts Gallery

1980 births
Living people
Makerere University alumni
Ugandan women artists